Kappa is a letter of the Greek alphabet.

Kappa may also refer to:

Measurement
 Cohen's kappa, also known as Kappa statistic
 Fleiss' kappa, another measure of inter-annotator agreement
 Kappa number, a measure of lignin content in wood pulp

Companies
 Kappa (brand), an Italian sportswear brand
 Kappa Publishing Group, publishing company

Automotive
 GM Kappa platform, subcompact rear-wheel drive automobile platform
 Lancia Kappa, an executive car
 Hyundai Kappa engine, automobile engine series

Places 
 Kappa, Illinois, a village
 Kappa Island, Antarctic island

Other uses 
 Kappa (folklore), a Japanese turtle-like humanoid
 Kappa (novel), by Ryūnosuke Akutagawa
 Kappa (Dungeons & Dragons), a game creature
Death Kappa, a Japanese kaiju film
 Kappa (rocket), a family of Japanese sounding rockets
 Kappa TV, a TV channel based in Kerala
 Knowledge and Power Preparatory Academy IV or KAPPA IV, a middle school in the Bronx, New York City
 "Kappa", a 1999 song by Mogwai from the album Come On Die Young
 Kappa chain, a type of immunoglobulin light chain, part of the human immune system
 Kappa, one of the most popular emotes on live streaming platform Twitch
 Kappa effect, a sensory illusion relating to the human perception of time
 SARS-CoV-2 Kappa variant, one of the variants of SARS-CoV-2, the virus that causes COVID-19

See also
 Honda Capa, a car sold in Japan
 Kalpa (aeon)
 Kapa (disambiguation)
 κ-opioid receptor
 Kappaphycus alvarezii, a type of seaweed